Annesbrook is an industrial suburb of Nelson, New Zealand.

The Nelson Classic Car Museum (which was previously the World of WearableArt & Classic Cars Museum) is located in Annesbrook.

Geography

The corresponding statistical area of Nelson Airport covers an area of 2.96 km².

History

The estimated population of the area reached 80 in 1996.

It reached 90 in 2001, 96 in 2006, 105 in 2013, and 96 in 2018.

Demography

It has a population density of 30.44 people per km² as of 2019.

Nelson Airport statistical area (Annesbrook) had a population of 96 at the 2018 New Zealand census, a decrease of 9 people (-8.6%) since the 2013 census, and unchanged since the 2006 census. There were 33 households. There were 57 males and 39 females, giving a sex ratio of 1.46 males per female. The median age was 36.4 years (compared with 37.4 years nationally), with 15 people (15.6%) aged under 15 years, 24 (25.0%) aged 15 to 29, 51 (53.1%) aged 30 to 64, and 9 (9.4%) aged 65 or older.

Ethnicities were 75.0% European/Pākehā, 9.4% Māori, 12.5% Pacific peoples, 6.2% Asian, and 6.2% other ethnicities (totals add to more than 100% since people could identify with multiple ethnicities).

The proportion of people born overseas was 18.8%, compared with 27.1% nationally.

Although some people objected to giving their religion, 50.0% had no religion, 31.2% were Christian, 3.1% were Hindu and 6.2% had other religions.

Of those at least 15 years old, 6 (7.4%) people had a bachelor or higher degree, and 15 (18.5%) people had no formal qualifications. The median income was $32,300, compared with $31,800 nationally. The employment status of those at least 15 was that 51 (63.0%) people were employed full-time, 6 (7.4%) were part-time, and 0 (0.0%) were unemployed.

Economy

In 2018, 21.1% worked in manufacturing, 5.3% worked in construction, 21.1% worked in hospitality, 5.3% worked in transport, and 5.3% worked in education.

Transport

As of 2018, among those who commuted to work, 63.2% drove a car, 5.3% rode in a car, 15.8% use a bike, and 15.8% walk or run.

No one used public transport.

References

Suburbs of Nelson, New Zealand
Populated places in the Nelson Region